Arden railway station was a station on the Slamannan Railway. The line connected mines and villages in the Central Scotland.

History

Opened by the Slamannan Railway, then joining the Edinburgh and Glasgow Railway, was absorbed into the North British Railway. It became part of the London and North Eastern Railway during the Grouping of 1923. The station was then closed by that company.

The site today

The site has been obliterated by open cast mining.

References

Sources
 
 
 
 Station on navigable O.S. map at centre near coal pit

External links
 RAILSCOT on the Slamannan Railway

Disused railway stations in Falkirk (council area)
Railway stations in Great Britain opened in 1840
Railway stations in Great Britain closed in 1930
1840 establishments in Scotland
1930 disestablishments in Scotland
Former North British Railway stations